Stefan Edberg was the defending champion, but lost in the semifinals to Brad Gilbert.

Pete Sampras won the title by defeating Brad Gilbert 6–2, 6–7(5–7), 6–3 in the final.

Seeds

Draw

Finals

Top half

Bottom half

References

External links
 Official results archive (ATP)
 Official results archive (ITF)

Los Angeles Open (tennis)
1991 ATP Tour
Volvo Tennis Los Angeles
Volvo Tennis Los Angeles